Himmat Ram Bhambhu (born 14 February 1956) is a nature activist, wildlife conservationist and environmental activist. He has received Padma Shri from Indian Government.

Personal life
Bhambhu was born on 14 February 1956. He was born in Sukwasi village, Nagaur district, Rajasthan.

Social services
Bhambhu was involved in planting trees, conserving birds and wildlife and forest conservation.

Awards
 Padma Shri (2020)
 Rajiv Gandhi Environment Protection Award (2014)
 Rajasthan State Amrita Devi Vishnoi award (2003)

References 

Living people
Recipients of the Padma Shri in social work
People from Nagpur district
1956 births